Magnoleptus is a genus of beetles in the family Laemophloeidae, containing the following species:

 Magnoleptus parallelicollis Lefkovitch, 1962
 Magnoleptus pugnaceus Lefkovitch, 1962

References

Laemophloeidae